Barbara Barondess (July 4, 1907 – May 31, 2000) was an American stage and film actress.  She was married to the actor Douglas MacLean from 1938 to 1948.

Selected filmography

 The Reckless Lady (1926)
 Summer Bachelors (1926)
 Rasputin and the Empress (1932)
 Hold Your Man (1933)
 Devil's Mate (1933)
 Luxury Liner (1933)
 Soldiers of the Storm (1933)
 Queen Christina (1933)
 When Strangers Marry (1933)
 Eight Girls in a Boat (1934)
 The Pursuit of Happiness (1934)
 Change of Heart (1934)
 Beggar's Holiday (1934)
 The Fountain (1934)
 Unknown Blonde (1934)
 Diamond Jim (1935)
 People Will Talk (1935)
 Life Begins at 40 (1935)
 A Tale of Two Cities (1935)
 Lady Be Careful (1936)
 Easy Money (1936)
 The Plot Thickens (1936)
 Make a Wish (1937)
 Fit for a King (1937)
 Emergency Squad (1940)

References

Bibliography
 Fleming E.J. Paul Bern: The Life and Famous Death of the MGM Director and Husband of Harlow. McFarland,  2009.
 Pitts, Michael R. Poverty Row Studios, 1929–1940: An Illustrated History of 55 Independent Film Companies, with a Filmography for Each. McFarland & Company, 2005.

External links

1907 births
2000 deaths
American film actresses
American stage actresses
People from Brooklyn